N33, or rijksweg 33, is an expressway in the provinces of Groningen and Drenthe in the Netherlands.

Provincial roads in the Netherlands
Provincial roads in Drenthe
Provincial roads in Groningen (province)
Transport in Eemsdelta
Transport in Het Hogeland
Transport in Midden-Groningen